Henderson Station One (HMP&L One) was a coal-fired power station owned and operated by the city of Henderson, Kentucky.

Citing rising costs and mounting environmental regulations, Henderson Municipal Power and Light closed its 58-year-old Station One power plant on Water Street by December 31, 2008.

It has since been replaced by Henderson Station Two (HMP&L Two) as a part of Sebree Station.

See also

Coal mining in Kentucky

References

External links
 Official website

Energy infrastructure completed in 1956
Buildings and structures in Henderson County, Kentucky
Henderson, Kentucky
Former coal-fired power stations in the United States
Coal-fired power plants in Kentucky
2008 disestablishments in Kentucky
1956 establishments in Kentucky